The General Federation of Trade Unions of Korea (GFTUK) is the sole legal trade union federation in North Korea. GFTUK was formed on November 30, 1945 as the General Federation of Trade Unions of North Korea. In January 1951, it was reorganized and adopted its current name. The chairman of the central committee of GFTUK is Pak In-chol.

Organization
, GFTUK has 1.6 million members, down from more than 2.4 million in the 1970s. During the Cold War, its membership was about half of the membership of the ruling Workers' Party of Korea (WPK). The ratio was comparatively low for a socialist country, evidencing the relatively unimportant role of unions in North Korea, which was one of the most industrialized socialist countries. Nevertheless, GFTUK was considered one of the most important mass organizations in the country. All workers of 30 years of age are required to be members of GFTUK if they are not members of WPK, the Union of Agricultural Workers of Korea, or the Socialist Women's Union of Korea.

Domestically, GFTUK is a member of the popular front Democratic Front for the Reunification of Korea. Internationally, the Federation is affiliated to the World Federation of Trade Unions, which it joined on May 2, 1947. The unions of GFTUK are affiliated to the various branch organizations of WFTU. The head of the international department of GFTUK is Im Jong-gi(임종기).

The website of the Korean Friendship Association states that "(The GFTUK) conducts ideological education to ensure its members fully understand the Juche idea and gets them to take part in socialist construction and the management of the socialist economy with the attitude befitting masters. It has its organizations in different branches of industry." However, the North Korea Handbook states that the GFTUK is not designed to serve its members but the WPK. GFTUK is directly controlled by the Central Committee of the WPK.

Rodongja Sinmun is the organ of the Central Committee of GFTUK. Officially, the guiding ideology of the organization is Kimilsungism–Kimjongilism.

Former chairmen
Ryom Sun-gil(렴순길) (2000s)
Ju Yong-gil(주용길) (2010s)
Ju Yong-guk (2010s)

List of unions affiliated to GFTUK
GFTUK has two types of trade unions, the ones in state enterprises and the ones in private enterprises.

The following trade unions, representing nine different industries, comprise GFTUK:
Trade Union of Metal and Engineering Industries of Korea
Trade Union of Mining and Power Industries of Korea
Trade Union of Light and Chemical Industries of Korea
Trade Union of Public Employees and Service Workers of Korea
Trade Union of Construction and Forestry Workers of Korea
Trade Union of Educational and Cultural Workers of Korea
Trade Union of Transport and Fisheries Workers of Korea

See also

Trade unions in South Korea

References

Works cited

Further reading

Trade unions in North Korea
National federations of trade unions
World Federation of Trade Unions
1945 establishments in Korea
Trade unions established in 1945
Workers' Party of Korea